Luquan, formerly Huailu County until 1994, is one of the eight districts of the prefecture-level city of Shijiazhuang, the capital of Hebei Province, North China. The town of Huolu, locally pronounced “Huailu”, is the urban center of Luquan District.

Administrative divisions
There are nine towns and three townships.

Towns:
Huolu, Tongye, Sijiazhuang, Shangzhuang, Licun, Yi'an, Huangbizhuang, Dahe, Shanyincun

Townships:
Shijing Township, Bailuquan Township, Shangzhai Township

Notes

References

External links

County-level divisions of Hebei
Shijiazhuang